The 2019 Thai League 3 is the third season of the Thai League 3, the third-tier professional league for association football clubs in Thailand, since its establishment in 2017, also known as Omsin League Pro due to the sponsorship deal with Government Savings Bank (Omsin Bank). A total of 28 teams would divided into 2 regions including 14 teams in the upper region and 14 teams in the lower region.

Changes from last season

Team changes

Promoted clubs

Promoted to the 2019 Thai League 2
JL Chiangmai United
MOF Customs United
Ayutthaya United

Promoted from the 2018 Thai League 4
Nakhon Pathom United
Khon Kaen United
North Bangkok University

Relegated clubs
Relegated to the 2019 Thai League 4 Northeastern Region
 Kalasin

Relegated to the 2019 Thai League 4 Bangkok Metropolitan Region
 Deffo

Relegated from 2018 Thai League 2
Krabi
Angthong

Renamed clubs
 WU Nakhon Si United was renamed to Nakhon Si United

Moved clubs
Simork were moved into the Upper Region 2019.

2019 Thai League 3 locations

Stadium and locations (Upper Region)

Stadium and locations (Lower Region)

Results

League table (Upper Region)

League table (Lower Region)

Third place play-off
This round was featured by Phrae United, the second place of 2019 Thai League 3 Upper Region and Ranong United, the second place of 2019 Thai League 3 Lower Region. Winners of third place play-off would promoted to 2020 Thai League 2.

Summary

|}

Matches

Phrae United won 1–0 on aggregate.

Final
This round was featured by Khon Kaen United, the first place of 2019 Thai League 3 Upper Region and Nakhon Pathom United, the first place of 2019 Thai League 3 Lower Region. Both winners and runners-up would promoted to 2020 Thai League 2 automatically.

Summary

|}

Matches

Khon Kaen United won 4–2 on aggregate.

See also
2019 Thai League 1
2019 Thai League 2
2019 Thai League 4
2020 Thailand Amateur League

References

External links
Official webpage of Thai League 3  (in Thai)

Thai League 3
2019 in Thai football leagues